James Baker House may refer to:

 James V. and Sophia Baker House, Cottonwood, Idaho, listed on the NRHP in Idaho County, Idaho
 James Baker House (Burkesville, Kentucky), listed on the NRHP in Kentucky
 James B. Baker House, Aberdeen, Maryland, listed on the NRHP in Maryland
 Jim Baker Cabin, Savery, Wyoming, listed on the NRHP in Carbon County, Wyoming